The 1987 Deutsche Tourenwagen Meisterschaft was the fourth season of premier German touring car championship and also second season under the moniker of Deutsche Tourenwagen Meisterschaft.

The championship was run under modified Group A regulations, which was won by Eric van de Poele driving a BMW M3.

Teams and drivers

References

Deutsche Tourenwagen Masters seasons
1988 in German motorsport
1988 in West German motorsport